The 2006 Bahraini Crown Prince Cup was the 6th edition of the cup tournament in men's football (soccer). This edition featured the top four sides from the Bahraini Premier League 2005-06 season.

Bracket

Bahraini Crown Prince Cup seasons
2006 domestic association football cups
2005–06 in Bahraini football